The Harris trains were the first steel-bodied Electric Multiple Unit train to operate on the suburban railway network of Melbourne, Victoria, Australia. They were introduced in 1956, by the Victorian Railways, and last operated in 1988, although a number of the carriages were converted for other uses and are still operating. They were named after Norman Charles Harris, Chairman of Commissioners of the Victorian Railways, between 1940 and 1950.

Description
The Harris trains were commonly referred to as "Blue Trains" due to their deep blue colour, with only a yellow band about halfway up the body. Royal blue and yellow were common colours for the Victorian Railways rolling stock.

The trains had a saloon seating layout, divided into smaller sections by full-height partitions. They were provided with either two or three sets of hand-operated dual sliding doors per carriage side. Later sets were fitted with power doors. Interiors were split into smoking and no-smoking compartments until late 1978, with the abolition of smoking on trains, and carriages were designated as First or Second class until 1958, when one class travel was introduced. Most of the carriages were delivered without end gangways between carriages, but safety concerns led to these being added in the final five sets as delivered from mid-1966. These sets were also fitted with only two doors per carriage side rather than three, permitting additional seating and reflecting the increasing average travel distance.

The first thirty trains were fitted with automatic couplers at both ends of all carriages, and the second series with semi-permanent drawbars, except for the driving ends of motor carriages, and one end of BT carriages. Later, drawbars were fitted in the middle of first series blocks and units, although the final ten Motor cars had automatic couplers at both ends.

First-series motor cars had 59 second-class seats and trailers 72 seats (first class in the T cars or second class in the BT cars), divided into smoking and non-smoking sections. For the second series the internal partitions were removed, and capacities increased to 65 and 80 passengers respectively for a total gain of 50 seats per seven-car train. Smoking was then only permitted in the middle third of each carriage. Later, a policy change saw smoking permitted in the whole of each Motor carriage, and not at all in trailers.

History
The first 30 7-carriage trains, known as the first series, were constructed in the United Kingdom by Gloucester Railway Carriage and Wagon Company, and delivered between 1956 and 1959. Another 30, the second series, were built by Martin & King in Melbourne, and delivered between 1961 and 1967. From 1966, these were delivered with end doors and gangways between carriages, allowing passengers to change carriages.

The first series of "T" and "BT" trailers were built by Comeng (the first 10 in Sydney, the rest in Melbourne), and finished by Martin & King, with the remainder built at the Newport Workshops. Between 1968 and 1970, ten additional motor carriages, built by the Victorian Railways' Newport Workshops, were delivered to provide for some Harris trains to be lengthened to eight carriages.

In 1970 and 1971, six new trailer carriages were built as prototypes for the next fleet (the Hitachi trains). However, it was not until the following year that a complete (4-carriage) train was used this way, after conversion of some motor carriages. These carriages were converted into H type carriages, for use in LH sets with V/Line, in the mid 1980s.

Operations
The Harris trains were originally run as 7-carriage (M-T-T-M-BT-T-M) sets, reduced to 4-carriage (M-T-T-M) sets for off-peak and weekend services. The M-T-T-M sets were known as "Blocks", while the BT-T-M sets were called "Units". The first thirty 7-car sets were delivered between 1956 and 1959, and the following thirty sets between 1961 and 1967. Initially the two types were kept separate because of the differing motor unit performance, and within the second series the final five trains had to be kept separate because of the inter-carriage walkways. This proved difficult to manage and in 1962 the segregation instruction was withdrawn. The first carriage to have walkways retrofitted was 862T in 1967, when it was rebuilt following fire damage.

In 1968-69 a further ten Motor cars were delivered. At the same time, some of the Units were reduced to BT-M only and allocated to the Sandringham Line, and these actions together allowed for the formation of additional M-T-T-M blocks so that eight-car trains could run on busier routes including Lilydale, Belgrave and Glen Waverley. Later platform extensions permitted operation of eight-car trains on the Frankston, Pakenham, Alamein, Upfield, Broadmeadows, St Albans and Williamstown lines. Occasionally, M-M pairs would also be used on shuttle services between Dandenong and Pakenham.

When the extended trailer cars entered service they were coupled to the new M cars, which had their power-closing door equipment activated or installed as required. The first set was 799M-891T-892T-800M (order unclear), and two more blocks were assembled using four of the seven motors in the range 792M-798M. In 1972 further cars 791M, 887T-890T and 557BT-560BT had the same equipment installed, giving a total of ten motors, six extended and four regular trailers and four backing trailers available to assemble three Long Blocks and four Units fitted with power door equipment.  At this point, the total fleet would have been 62 Short Blocks, 3 Long Blocks with power-closing doors, 4 Pairs, 52 normal units and 4 Units with power-closing doors.

Another difference between the first- and second-series trains was the destination rolls; the former had included Carnegie, North Williamstown, Elsternwick, Ashburton, Blackburn, Macaulay, Thomastown and Rosanna, which were replaced in the latter with Mentone, Crib Point, Holmesglen, Belgrave and Upfield.

Notable uses
Aside from normal suburban train use, Harris trains featured in a handful of special services. Two trains, a seven-car and special ten-car set (composed of two Units and a Block) ran to Warragul on 23 February 1963 for royal traffic, and around the same time a ten- and eleven-car set (two Blocks with a Unit between them) ran to Geelong, respectively hauled by locomotives T332 and B65.

Modifications
By the time the first ten 7-car sets had been delivered, it was found that the buffing plates between carriages would bind when going around tight curves or through complicated point-work, so this equipment was removed in time for delivery of the 11th train. However, this left a lot of slack between carriages, so acceleration and braking would be both rough and noisy.

Around the same time, the Victorian Railways was experimenting with replacing cast-iron brake blocks with a non-metallic compound (probably asbestos), so Set 11 was fitted with these, and tested between Seaford and Frankston, in 5 mph increments up to line speed, in both directions. Four tests were made - first using the non-metallic brake blocks with empty and later loaded with cast-iron blocks, equal in weight to a crush load of passengers, and then with the cast iron brake blocks fitted to the train, as well as simulating the load, and finally the empty train with cast iron brake blocks. It was found that the new type of brake blocks performed better at higher speeds, but worse at lower speeds, so on average they gave similar performance and were approved for use. A similar test was later conducted with the Walker railmotors between Laverton and Werribee.

In the 1960s the fleet was fitted with Guard-to-Driver bell communication circuits.

Wheel slip was found to be a problem with the more powerful 500-series motors, so in the late 1960s through early 1970s the "weak field" power generation, which used the back-EMF from the motors, was disconnected. 547M was fitted with an experimental wheel-slip solution, but the final implementation as applied across the fleet would close off the power supply, then re-open it bypassing the acceleration control when wheel-slip was detected, with limited success. The weak-field system was reconnected in the late 1970s to early 1980s in order to keep up with amended timetables, but this brought back the wheel slip issues.

By the time the second series (700+) Harris cars were being delivered, the design had been improved somewhat. A second window was fitted at the front of the Motor carriages for the guard and/or instructor driver to view the track, along with a window from the Guard's compartment into the passenger saloon, and walkways were added between all carriages within each Block or Unit. These latter changes were retrofitted to many of the 500-series carriages as well, following concerns about safety. While the 500-series trains had rotary flettner ventilators fitted; these were mounted on the curve of the roof and spun off-centre, causing a grinding noise. This was fixed in the second series with the units fitted level to the carriage floor. These units were also later fitted to the clerestory-roofed Tait stock, with their opening ceiling-windows being sealed to reduce maintenance costs.

The last few vehicles constructed were used as test-beds for features in the upcoming Hitachi train design. 560BT, when issued to service, had a short stainless steel exterior panel between the centre windows.  Similar stainless steel panels were placed around bridgeworks at East Richmond, the purpose of both to check for weathering and cleaning methods. The last six trailer vehicles, 891-896T, were 75 ft long over body instead of 60 ft to test clearances at platforms and junctions along with passenger flows. However, the cars were significantly heavier and when coupled to 700-series motors already featuring weaker acceleration further impacting timekeeping.

While the last ten motors (791M-800M) were issued without asbestos insulation, only the last three had additional insulation in the ceiling. 799M was a further modification of the type with a forced draught ventilation system, shared with the long trailers, while 798M and 800M used the normal flettner ventilators. Similarly, 556-560BT and the long trailers were not fitted with asbestos.

By the mid-1970s individual Harris cars were being sent to Bendigo North Workshops for fitting of end doors and gangways. Examples included 702M, 621T and 684T in September 1975.

Conversions and disposal

719M was the first Harris car of any type to be scrapped, due to fire damage at Sunshine in February 1973. It was scrapped at Newport Workshops on 16 September 1975, having been judged as too expensive to repair.

With the exceptions of the last few carriages built, all Harris trains contained asbestos insulation. The first sets contained blue asbestos, and the later sets contained white asbestos. Due to the presence of asbestos, most were disposed of in the 1990s, by being buried at Talbot Quarry in Clayton, a south-eastern suburb of Melbourne, some having been wrapped in plastic.

No original Harris trailer cars remain, with all trailers having been converted to locomotive-hauled H cars or scrapped. Additionally, no first series motor units were preserved, the three remaining unmodified cars being high-numbered second series M cars.

Ozride set
In the mid 1980s three cars were painted pink on the ends and one side for a railway safety video. The set was 780M-674T-1555M, and operated with locomotive T334, with filming taking place primarily on the Geelong-Gheringhap line. The motor cars had their pantographs removed for the duration of filming.

Green set
A set of four carriages was refurbished in the late 80s and repainted into an experimental green and yellow livery for The Met. However, the Minister for Transport at the time didn't like the colour scheme and, without the train having moved, ordered it repainted into the traditional blue and gold scheme. The motor cars are known to have been 521M and 528M, and the trailers are believed to have been 641T and 863T.

Refurbishment
A program to refurbish the Harris trains began in 1982. The interior of the refurbished cars resembled a Comeng interior, having individual vinyl foam type seat cushions on an integrated plastic frame, replacing the former more traditional vinyl sprung seats. Each motor carriage was modernised with a fibreglass front clip, the pantographs relocated to the rear of the carriage and Scharfenberg couplers replacing the original knuckle couplers. The upgraded front clip also featured Comeng-style quad high and low beam headlights, replacing the single central headlight of the original Harris design, however the destination signs and marker lights remained unchanged. The driver's controls were also changed to a Comeng-style layout. The refurbished cars also had air conditioning, sealed windows, self-closing doors, and a new colour scheme. Due to their predominantly grey livery, with only a pair of orange stripes along the sides, the refurbished trains were known as "Grey Ghosts".

The motor units were originally numbered in the 601-608M range, though these numbers later came into conflict with the Comeng fleet, and so in mid-late 1984, the cars were renumbered into the 901-908M range. The trailers were released to service in the 101-108T range, becoming 1501-1508T in 1983, and then 3501-3508T in 1984. In 1984, the carriages were repainted into The Met's green and yellow livery.

Industrial and other problems with the refurbished trains meant that only 16 carriages were converted before the program was stopped, and the refurbished trains were withdrawn in 1991, with five motor units (901M and 904-907M) cut up for scrap. One refurbished carriage, 903M, has been preserved, and is on display at the Newport Railway Museum. All eight refurbished trailer cars were converted to standard H type passenger cars, along with motors 902M and 908M which were converted to the BCH sub-class, specifically, "short van" carriages BCH134 and BCH135.

The four refurbished trains ran initially in an M-T-T-M configuration, but three of the trains were later remarshalled to M-T-M-M-T-M configuration.

The refurbished trains generally ran on the Port Melbourne, St Kilda and Sandringham lines. They never ran in the City Loop, except for a farewell tour on 6 April 1991. The restriction to these three lines was due to the additional weight of the refurbished carriages; while the passenger areas were upgraded and included two air conditioning units per car, the mechanical components were still unmodified, and still using the 1960s-era second series motors, which were in fact less powerful than the first series cars of 1956.

Locomotive-hauled services
55 carriages, including the  carriages, were converted to H type carriages for interurban service and are still in operation with V/Line as of May 2020. These trains will continue in service until at least 2022.

Similarly, four carriages were converted to MTH carriages, which were used as trailer cars behind DERM and DRC railmotors for many years. In later years, they were used on the Stony Point line, behind A class diesel locomotives until 26 April 2008, when Sprinter trains were introduced on the route. MTH102 was converted to a special overhead inspection car for Metro Trains Melbourne, and is now numbered IEV102.

Preservation
With most of the fleet being buried due to asbestos, or converted to H-type carriages, only four have survived.

Motor cars 795M and refurbished 903M (both pictured below) are preserved at the Newport Railway Museum.

Greaser cars 794M and 797M are owned by VicTrack, and are stored at Newport Workshops.

A note in Newsrail, May 1989, indicated that seven cars, with asbestos components removed, were to be preserved as an operational set, using cars 1522M, 798M, 799M, 2515T, 2606T, 2850T and 883T, in conjunction with The Met's celebrations of the 70th anniversary of the Melbourne railway electrification project. However, all those cars were placed off-register in 1990. It is worth noting that 798M and 799M were built without either blue or white asbestos insulation.

Models

N Scale 1:160 
Brimbank Models has developed a range of 3D-printed Harris carriages and components which can be purchased and assembled for standard mechanisms. The carriages will be available as complete-body kits, or as a range of parts.  The cost is generally around $80 per carriage plus mechanisms for motor cars, which the purchaser must source separately.

HO Scale 1:87

Auscision
Auscision models announced plans to produce Harris models in 2015; pre-orders opened in January 2022. The run includes motor cars in the 700 series only (likely due to the additional window at the front), and trailers across all types except the long variants. Each set, whether four- or seven-cars, will contain one motorised and two illuminated M cars, with the remainder unlit and unpowered.

Trainbuilder
Trainbuilder has produced Harris trains in brass. Sets available included regular blocks and units, a block with two long trailers, and the Greaser M-M set.

Gallery

References

External links 

 Harris trains on VicSig (enthusiast site).
 Suburban carriage details by Peter J. Vincent.
 V/LineCars.com - MTH Carriages

Melbourne rail rollingstock
Electric multiple units of Victoria (Australia)
Gloucester multiple units
1500 V DC multiple units of Victoria